Fonmon Castle is a fortified medieval castle near the village of Fonmon in the Vale of Glamorgan and a Grade I listed building. The castle's gardens are designated Grade II on the Cadw/ICOMOS Register of Parks and Gardens of Special Historic Interest in Wales. With its origins rooted in the 12th century it is today seen as a great architectural rarity, as it is one of few buildings that was drastically remodelled in the 18th century, but not Gothicized. The castle is believed to have remained under the ownership of just two families throughout its history; from Norman times, it was owned by the St Johns, and from 1656, by the descendants of Colonel Philip Jones.

History
The origins of Fonmon Castle are poorly documented and most of its early history has been discovered through studying its architecture. A popular myth exists that the castle was built by Oliver St John of Fonmon, one of the Twelve Knights of Glamorgan who effected the Norman conquest of Glamorgan. It has since been shown that this was a legendary tale given credence by a "historic" recount in the 1560s by Sir Edward Stradling.

There is speculation that a defensive fortification made of timber was built on the site of Fonmon Castle soon after the Norman invasion of Wales, with stonework added around 1200. The thick walls to the left of the entrance is easily identifiable as 12th century in design, and shows the existence of a rectangular keep. This keep was relatively small in size, approximately 8m x 13m. In the 13th century a curtain wall was added to the east side of the keep leading towards a steep scarp. This was followed by a much larger L-shaped build to the south with a south-east tower added at the angle. The east wall along the ravine edge has the castle's thickest walls, which is a curiosity as this would have been the most difficult side to attack. It is therefore believed that some other defensive structure may have existed to protect the more vulnerable south and west approaches. These early constructions are thought to have been undertaken by the St. John family (see Viscounts Bolingbroke), who were associated with the castle during the Middle Ages and continued as owners until 1656. It was not until the 16th century that the next major addition was made, a short north wing built over a barrel-vaulted semi-basement.

The castle survived being damaged during the English Civil War, with the St. John family supporting the Parliamentarians, but shortly thereafter, they fell into financial difficulties and the castle was sold to Colonel Philip Jones. It is believed that Jones then improved the rooms on the east range, and added a double-depth wing to the north side. Upon Jones' death, the castle was passed down to his son, Oliver, who owned the castle from 1678 to 1685. It was Oliver's great-grandson, Robert Jones III, who was to make the next major redevelopment to the castle. He married Jane Seys, heiress to the Seys of Boverton, and in 1762, they began improvements, employing Thomas Paty of Bristol. The firm added render, and made additions the battlements to give it more of an appearance of a castle.

The estate went into a period of decline in the 19th century, and little work was done to the castle except for the addition of the entrance porch, and the extension to the south wing in the period between 1840 and 1878. The castle passed by marriage to Sir Seymour Boothby of the Boothby baronets in 1917. In 2019, the castle, and some 350 acres of the surviving estate, was acquired by Nigel Ford. Amongst several other initiatives, a forward-thinking and extensive 'wilding' project has commenced in an effort to improve the biodiversity of the area.

In 2020, after the sale of the castle to a local businessman, new visitor facilities were added to the grounds, including a history-themed attraction called "Step Through Time", managed by Welsh actor Ross O'Hennessy. In addition, there is a dinosaur park and a re-wilding project.

Architecture

Exterior

Fonmon Castle is situated in extensive gardens which are designated Grade II on the Cadw/ICOMOS Register of Parks and Gardens of Special Historic Interest in Wales. It is constructed of local sourced stone, primarily limestone and blue lias rubble. There is one arched internal doorway which appears to be Sutton stone; but are covered in grey render which disguises much of the stonework. The roofs are of mixed slates with lead gutters and dressings. The main building is of two and three storeys and castellated almost throughout. Apart from the south east corner tower, which is slightly higher, the walls are largely uniform in height.

In the grounds, to the south west of the house, there is an 18th-century stable which incorporates a late medieval barn. The south and east walls of the stable are castellated to impress those approaching from the south. The stable has a fine polygonal stone chimney, which is a rare surviving medieval find, taken from East Orchard Farm, St Athan. The Joneses acquired East Orchard Farm in 1756, but abandoned the building after stripping it of its dressed stonework.

Further south is a battlemented watch tower of either 17th or 18th century design, thought to have been modelled on the one found at St Donats. It is believed the watch tower was constructed in two builds, and may have been founded on original ruined medieval stonework. Although it appears to be of 16th century design, it does not appear on the estate plan of 1622, but does appear on the plans of 1770 giving a wide window for its construction date. Due to its time scale and features, it is assumed to have been constructed during the medievalizing improvements carried out by Robert Jones III. It is constructed of local roughly coursed limestone rubble, which has been lime-plastered. It was given Grade II* listed building status in 1952, with the reason given "an interesting example of a C16 and late C18 look-out tower and for its group value within the gardens of Fonmon Castle".

Interior
Notable features include the combined grand drawing room and library, designed by Thomas Stocking. Described by Newman as the "glory of Fonmon", the library, running east to west is lit by two Venetian windows, a stone one to the west wall and a sashed timber oriel window to the east. The room is divided into three sections, the largest central, with square end bays with segmental arches. There are trophies of the chase in the spandrels of the arches and arabesques and wreaths adorn the flat of the ceiling with an Apollo head in a sunburst at its centre.

References

Bibliography

Further reading

External links
Fonmon Castle website
Vale of Glamorgan website about the castle

Museums in the Vale of Glamorgan
Historic house museums in Wales
Gardens in Wales
Castles in the Vale of Glamorgan
Country houses in Wales
Houses in the Vale of Glamorgan
Grade I listed castles in Wales
Grade I listed buildings in the Vale of Glamorgan
Registered historic parks and gardens in the Vale of Glamorgan
Georgian architecture in Wales